Manjala is a genus of Australian intertidal spiders first described by V. T. Davies in 1990.  it contains only three species.

References

Araneomorphae genera
Desidae
Spiders of Australia
Taxa named by Valerie Todd Davies